As of 2019, the discography of Dutch pop-rock group BLØF consists of 14 studio albums, 12 live albums, 3 compilation albums, 5 DVDs/Blu-rays, 45 singles, and 2 EPs.

Albums

Studio albums

Compilations

Live albums

EPs

Singles

DVDs

References 

Discographies of Dutch artists
Pop music group discographies
Rock music group discographies